Kurt Reinhard may refer to:

 Kurt Reinhard (musicologist) (1914–1979), German musicologist and ethnomusicologist
 Kurt Reinhard (Austrian Righteous among the Nations)